Iva Budařová and Regina Rajchrtová won in the final 6–2, 6–4 against Gaby Castro and Conchita Martínez.

Seeds
Champion seeds are indicated in bold text while text in italics indicates the round in which those seeds were eliminated.

 Sabrina Goleš /  Tine Scheuer-Larsen (quarterfinals)
 Sandra Cecchini /  Patricia Tarabini (semifinals)
 Iva Budařová /  Regina Rajchrtová (champions)
 Kate McDonald /  Adriana Villagrán (quarterfinals)

Draw

External links
 1989 Estoril Open Doubles Draw

1989 Estoril Open